National Construction Rentals is the largest supplier of temporary fencing in the United States.  Started by Dick Mooneyham in 1962, the company rents equipment such as fencing, barricades, restrooms, mobile storage, and temporary fencing to commercial and residential customers.  The equipment is used for construction, events, and emergency response.

History
Dick Mooneyham purchased Republic Fence in 1962 and renamed the company Rent A Fence Company.  By 1970, the company had renamed itself National Rent A Fence.  In 1984, the name was changed to National Construction Rentals and now has locations in 41 states.

References

External links

Business services companies established in 1962
Privately held companies based in California